In the Abilene paradox, a group of people collectively decide on a course of action that is counter to the preferences of many or all of the individuals in the group. It involves a common breakdown of group communication in which each member mistakenly believes that their own preferences are counter to the group's and, therefore, does not raise objections, or even states support for an outcome they do not want. A common phrase relating to the Abilene paradox is a desire to not "rock the boat". This differs from groupthink in that the Abilene paradox is characterized by an inability to manage agreement.

Explanation
The term was introduced by management expert Jerry B. Harvey in his 1974 article "The Abilene Paradox: The Management of Agreement". The name of the phenomenon comes from an anecdote that Harvey uses in the article to elucidate the paradox:

The Abilene paradox is similar to groupthink; however, groupthink individuals are not acting contrary to their conscious wishes and generally feel good about the group decisions. Like groupthink theories, the Abilene paradox theory is used to illustrate that groups not only have problems managing disagreements, but that agreements may also be a problem in a poorly functioning group.

Research
The phenomenon is explained by social psychology theories of social conformity and social influence, which suggest human beings are often very averse to acting contrary to the trend of a group. According to Harvey, the phenomenon may occur when individuals experience "action-anxiety"—stress concerning the group potentially expressing negative attitudes towards them if they do not go along. This action anxiety arises from what Harvey termed "negative fantasies"—unpleasant visualizations of what the group might say or do if individuals are honest about their opinions—when there is a "real risk" of displeasure and negative consequences for not going along. The individual may experience "separation anxiety", fearing exclusion from the group.

Applications of the theory
The theory is often used to help explain extremely poor group decisions, especially notions of the superiority of "rule by committee". For example, Harvey cited the Watergate scandal as a potential instance of the Abilene paradox in action. The Watergate scandal occurred in the United States in the 1970s when many high officials of the Nixon administration colluded in the cover-up and execution of a break-in at the Democratic National Committee headquarters in Washington, D.C. Harvey quotes several people indicted for the coverup as indicating that they had personal qualms about the decision but feared to voice them. In one instance, campaign aide Herbert Porter said that he "was not one to stand up in a meeting and say that this should be stopped", a decision that he attributed to "the fear of the group pressure that would ensue, of not being a team player".

See also

 Argumentum ad populum
 Asch conformity experiments
 Elephant in the room
 False consensus effect
 Group polarization
 Groupshift
 Keynesian beauty contest
 Peer pressure
 Pluralistic ignorance
 Prediction market
 Preference falsification
 Prisoner's dilemma
 Pseudoconsensus
 Special interests
 Spiral of silence
 The Wisdom of Crowds

References

Further reading

 Harvey, Jerry B. (1988). The Abilene Paradox and Other Meditations on Management. Lexington, Mass: Lexington Books. 
 Harvey, Jerry B. (1996). The Abilene Paradox and Other Meditations on Management (paperback). San Francisco: Jossey-Bass. 
 Harvey, Jerry B. (1999). How Come Every Time I Get Stabbed in the Back, My Fingerprints Are on the Knife?. San Francisco: Jossey-Bass.

External links
 Abilene Paradox (Documentary film by Peter J. Jordan, 1984)

Conformity
Decision-making paradoxes
Abilene, Texas
Management